George Wilson (7 April 1887 – 10 January 1970) was a Scottish footballer who played mainly as a half back (capable of playing on either flank, or in the centre). His only club at the professional level was Aberdeen where he spent eight years, having moved to the city as a teenager to study at its main university; he initially joined the Dons as a centre forward. He was forced to retire after sustaining a serious injury to his kneecap in January 1914.

References

1887 births
1970 deaths
Sportspeople from Highland (council area)
People from Ross and Cromarty
Association football wing halves
Scottish footballers
Aberdeen F.C. players
Scottish Football League players
Alumni of the University of Aberdeen